Cameroon competed in the 2010 Commonwealth Games held in Delhi, India, from 3 to 14 October 2010.

Medalists

Wrestling 
Cameroon sent only one participant, Laure Ali Annabel. She won silver medal in the Women's freestyle 72 kg event.

See also
 2010 Commonwealth Games

Nations at the 2010 Commonwealth Games
Cameroon at the Commonwealth Games
2010 in Cameroonian sport